Melody J. Stewart (born February 19, 1962) is a justice of the Ohio Supreme Court. She formerly served as a Judge on the Ohio Eighth District Court of Appeals. Stewart was elected to the Ohio Supreme Court in 2018, having defeated incumbent Justice Mary DeGenaro.

Education 

Stewart earned a Bachelor of Music degree from the College-Conservatory of Music at the University of Cincinnati; her Juris Doctor as a Patricia Roberts Harris Fellow from the Cleveland-Marshall College of Law; and her Doctor of Philosophy as a Mandel Leadership Fellow at Case Western Reserve University’s Mandel School of Applied Social Sciences.

State judicial career 

She was first elected to the Ohio District Court of Appeals in 2006 and twice re-elected.

Ohio Supreme Court 

On November 8, 2018, Stewart faced incumbent Mary DeGenaro in the general election for a seat on the Supreme Court. She won the seat 52.5% to 47.5%. She is the first African-American woman elected to the Supreme Court.

Teaching 

She worked as a lecturer, an adjunct instructor, and an assistant dean at Cleveland-Marshall College of Law before joining the faculty.  Her primary teaching areas were ethics and professional responsibility, criminal law, criminal procedure, and legal research, writing, and advocacy.  Additionally, she taught at the University of Toledo College of Law, at Ursuline College, and was Director of Student Services at Case Western Reserve University's School of Law.

See also 
 List of African-American jurists

References

External links 

1962 births
Living people
20th-century American lawyers
21st-century American judges
African-American judges
African-American lawyers
Case Western Reserve University alumni
Cleveland–Marshall College of Law alumni
Cleveland State University faculty
Judges of the Ohio District Courts of Appeals
Lawyers from Cleveland
Ohio Democrats
Justices of the Ohio Supreme Court
University of Cincinnati alumni
20th-century American women lawyers
21st-century American women judges
American women academics
20th-century African-American women
20th-century African-American people
21st-century African-American women
21st-century African-American people